Inoke Bainimoli (born 18 September 1958) is a Fijian sprinter. He competed in the men's 100 metres at the 1984 Summer Olympics.

References

1958 births
Living people
Athletes (track and field) at the 1984 Summer Olympics
Fijian male sprinters
Olympic athletes of Fiji
Athletes (track and field) at the 1982 Commonwealth Games
Commonwealth Games competitors for Fiji
Place of birth missing (living people)